Julie Ming-Jue Rogers (born 2 November 1998) was one of the youngest participants in the 2012 Summer Paralympics representing Great Britain in the sitting volleyball team. In the buildup to the 2016 Summer Paralympics Rogers switched sports to track and field athletics, competing as a T42 classification sprinter.

Sports career
When Rogers participated in the 2012 Summer Paralympics she was still a student at Bedford Modern School and some 26 years junior to her fellow team member, Martine Wright. Since her participation in the 2012 Summer Paralympics, Rogers has changed her attention to athletics where she has become one of the fastest female Paralympic sprinters in the UK.  In 2014, Rogers' fastest time as a sprinter was 5th in the world rankings for that year.

References

1998 births
Volleyball players at the 2012 Summer Paralympics
Paralympic volleyball players of Great Britain
Sportspeople from Bedford
Living people
People educated at Bedford Modern School
British sitting volleyball players
Women's sitting volleyball players
British female sprinters
British people of Chinese descent